Colette Régis (1893–1978) was a French film actress.

Selected filmography

 Rasputin (1938) - Une religieuse (uncredited)
 Three Waltzes (1938) - Sarah Bernhardt
 La Bête Humaine (1938) - Victoire Pecqueux
 Trois de St Cyr (1939) - Mme Mercier
 Sarajevo (1940) - L'archiduchesse Isabelle
 Volpone (1941) - La marquise
 Ne bougez plus (1941) - Une cliente de la photo
 Le briseur de chaînes (1941) - Mme Ferdinand
 Caprices (1942) - La vieille dame
 Mademoiselle Swing (1942) - La dame de l'association
 Huit hommes dans un château (1942) - La comtesse de Chanceau
 Picpus (1943) - Madame Le Cloaguen
 La Main du diable (1943) - Madame Duval (uncredited)
 Le secret de Madame Clapain (1943) - Une dame
 Le val d'enfer (1943) - La religieuse
 Martin Roumagnac (1946) - Madame Rimbaut - la femme de l'adjoint au maire 
 La kermesse rouge (1947) - La duchesse d'Alençon
 Miroir (1947) - La marquise
 La grande Maguet (1947) - Béatrice Arnold
 Tous les deux (1949)
 Scandal on the Champs-Élysées (1949) - Suzanne
 Rendezvous in July (1949)
 Mademoiselle de la Ferté (1949) - Madame de Saint-Selve
 Monseigneur (1949) - La comtesse (uncredited)
 Justice Is Done (1950) - Hortense - la mère de Lucie
 The Glass Castle (1950) - La tenancière de l'hôtel
 Without Leaving an Address (1951) - La cliente en bagarre
 Darling Caroline (1951) - La marquise de Bièvre
 Under the Sky of Paris (1951) - L'infirmière-chef
 Folie douce (1951)
 The Night Is My Kingdom (1951) - Mme Turgot
 Le Plus Joli Péché du monde (1951) - Mme Lebreton
 Une histoire d'amour (1951) - Une invitée (uncredited)
 Trois vieilles filles en folie (1952) - Amélie
 Adorable Creatures (1952) - The Marquise (uncredited)
 Drôle de noce (1952) 
 Buridan, héros de la tour de Nesle (1952) - Mabelle
 Imperial Violets (1952) - Mme de Montijo
 When You Read This Letter (1953) - La supérieure
 The Earrings of Madame de… (1953) - Vendeuse de cierges (uncredited)
 Le Guérisseur (1953) - Louise Mériadec
 It's the Paris Life (1954) - La comtesse 
 Le Congrès des belles-mères (1954)
 Attila (1954) - Galla Placidia
 Le secret de soeur Angèle (1956) - La mère
 The Bride Is Much Too Beautiful (1956) - Aunt Yvonne
 I'll Get Back to Kandara (1956) - Madame Bergamier - la belle-mère
 La nuit des suspectes (1957) - Mammy
 Ramuntcho (1959) - La supériere
 La bête à l'affût (1959) - Une amie d'Elisabeth
 Seven Days... Seven Nights (1960) - Miss Giraud
 Tomorrow Is My Turn (1960) - La mère d'Alice / Baker's Wife
 The Gigolo (1960) - L'infirmière
 The Truth (1960) - La logeuse de Gilbert
 Par-dessus le mur (1961)
 L'assassin est dans l'annuaire (1961) - (uncredited)
 Les Abysses (1963) - Mme. Lapeyre
 Three Girls in Paris (1963)
 La bonne soupe (1964) - La dame de la Croix-rouge (uncredited)
 Dandelions by the Roots (1964) - Christine
 Les amitiés particulières (1964) - La religieuse (uncredited)
 The Vampire of Düsseldorf (1965) - La patronne du cabaret
 Pas de caviar pour tante Olga (1965) 
 Five Wild Kids (1966) - Tante Marthe
 Salut Berthe! (1968) - Une cliente de l'hôtel (uncredited)
 The Black Hand (1968) - La gouvernante
 Goto, Island of Love (1969) - La directrice
 Ballade pour un chien (1969)
 Le coeur fou (1970)
 Le petit matin (1971) - La grand-mère
  (1971)

References

Bibliography
 Hayward, Susan. French Costume Drama of the 1950s: Fashioning Politics in Film. Intellect Books, 2010.

External links
 

1893 births
1978 deaths
People from Brive-la-Gaillarde
French stage actresses
French film actresses
20th-century French women